Mill George (foaled  April 12, 1975) is an American Thoroughbred racehorse who is known for his stud career.

Career

Mill George is the foal of Mill Reef, a racehorse with multiple stakes wins, and Miss Charisma.

His first race was on February 5, 1978, where he came in 7th place at Santa Anita.

Mill George raced three more races, two of which were wins at Santa Anita and Hollywood Park, because suffering a fracture. The injury ended his career and he was exported to Japan as a stallion.

Stud career
Mill George had a successful stud career, where he was the leading sire of Japan in 1989. He retired from stallion duties in 1999. His descendants include:

c = colt, f = filly

Pedigree

References

1976 racehorse births